Betty Tate may refer to:

Betty Tate-Hughes, character in Atlantic (film) 
Betty Tate, songwriter, see Delta Dawn (album)

See also
Elizabeth Tate (disambiguation)